Hibbertia ovata is a species of flowering plant in the family Dilleniaceae and is endemic to Western Australia. It flowers from July to November and has yellow flowers. It was first formally described in 1845 by Ernst Gottlieb von Steudel in Lehmann's Plantae Preissianae. The specific epithet (ovata) means "wider below the middle", referring to the leaves.

This species is found on the Darling Scarp in the Jarrah Forest and Swan Coastal Plain biogeographic regions of south-western Western Australia.

See also
List of Hibbertia species

References

ovata
Flora of Western Australia
Plants described in 1845
Taxa named by Ernst Gottlieb von Steudel